The Abyssinian catbird or juniper babbler (Sylvia galinieri) is a species of bird in the family Sylviidae. (It is unrelated to other birds with the common name catbird). It is endemic to Ethiopia where it is found in highland forest and scrub. The Abyssinian catbird is a fairly small, mostly grey bird with black lores, whitish forehead and chestnut vent.

Description
The Abyssinian catbird is a small-sized babbler. Its body is round with relatively short wings and legs. The bird's belly is white, but its upper parts are a lighter shade of grey that gradually fades to a darker shade moving to the backside of the bird. The head of the bird is a light shade of grey with dark highlights surrounding the eyes. The eyes themselves have a scarlet iris surrounding dark brown pupils. The beak is short pointed and black. Its wings are the darkest parts of its body having parallel bars of black along its length with the rest of the wing being grey. Its underside from its legs to its tail is a distinct orange that gives way to a tail that is about half the length of the bird itself.
The bird was formerly the sole member of the genus Parophasma, and its taxonomy is still inconclusive. It is not yet certain if they are more closely related to babblers or warblers.

Distribution and Habitat
The Abyssinian catbird is a resident of the Afrotropical realm and is endemic to Ethiopia, meaning that it is exclusively found in that region. They have an area of occurrence of 44,500 km. They prefer forested habitats and dry thickets, and so are most commonly found in highland bamboo, juniper, and olive trees. They are not known to migrate outside of their habitat.

Behavior

Diet
The Abyssinian catbird has a wide-ranging diet, consisting mostly of small, edible things. This bird is known to eat juniper berries, along with other small fruits. They are also known to have a diet of various insects that are found in their habitat. The Abyssinian catbird is often found in shrubby areas, so it is easy to pick berries or find insects on its daily path.

Vocalization
It has been said that the Abyssinian catbird is the finest singer of the African birds. Oftentimes during the rainy season, the male and female Abyssinian catbirds can be found harmonizing together to make an even more beautiful song. The male, long-necked and wings spread, makes a loud ringing sound while the female releases a purring sound.

Breeding Habits
Abyssinian catbirds are known to breed in the season from February to August (or January to July). Their nests, often consisting of a tangle of vines and plant stems, hold two pale-colored, dark-speckled eggs.

Threats
The Abyssinian catbird is evaluated to be least concern on the IUCN Red List and does not have any reported threats. The bird is relatively abundant in its general area, despite its apparent decreasing population trend.

References

Abyssinian catbird
Endemic birds of Ethiopia
Abyssinian catbird
Taxonomy articles created by Polbot